Karmacoda are an American trip hop group based in San Francisco, CA. The group currently includes singer Jessica Ford, singer/guitarist B., and bassist Eric Matsuno.

History

Karmacoda was formed in 2000 by singer/guitarist B. (Brett Crockett) and singer Heather Pierce, who shared an interest in trip hop and drum and bass. Their group name was inspired by the song "Karmacoma" by Massive Attack. Drummer Bruce Fulford and bassist Brian Templeton completed the lineup. The group released their debut album Reco Mended in 2001, before they had performed live. On this album B. and Pierce shared lead vocals, but Pierce would become the dominant singer on later albums. Fulford then left the group; instead of finding a new drummer the group added Rafael Acevedo as a DJ.

The song "Swan" won the award for Best Film/TV Song at the third annual Independent Music Awards in early 2004. The group's second album Evidence was released later in 2004, and displayed influences from soul music. Bassist Brian Templeton then departed and was replaced by Eric Matsuno. The group's third studio album Illuminate was released in 2007. Eternal was released in 2011.

Heather Pierce left the group in 2012 to focus on her teaching career. For the group's 2015 album Love and Fate, Volume 1, several different female singers were recruited to perform duets with B. Jessica Ford then joined the group as the permanent lead singer; the album Intimate was released in 2018.

Discography
Reco Mended (2001)
Evidence (2003)
Altered Evidence: Late Night Remixes (2004)
Illuminate (2007)
Lux Life: Illuminated Remixes (2008)
Ultraviolet Live (2009)
Eternal (2011)
Love and Fate, Volume 1 (2015)
Intimate (2018)

References

External links
 Official website
 Facebook
 Twitter
 MySpace

Trip hop groups
Electronic music groups from California
Independent Music Awards winners